Minuscule 304 (in the Gregory-Aland numbering), A215Cμ23 (Soden), is a Greek minuscule manuscript of the New Testament, on parchment. Palaeographically it has been assigned to the 12th century.

Description 

The codex contains the text of the Gospel of Matthew and Gospel of Mark on 224 parchment leaves with only one lacuna in Mark 14:16-25. The text is written in one column per page, in 31-33 lines per page. The biblical text is surrounded by a catena.

Text 

The Greek text of the codex is a representative of the Byzantine text-type. Aland placed it in Category V.
According to Hermann von Soden it has Antiocheian commentated text (Antiocheian = Byzantine).

It does not contain the text of the Longer Ending of Mark.

Hermann von Soden lists it as having the "Anonymous Catena" on Matthew (along with 366 and 2482).

History 

The manuscript once belonged to Charles de Montchal, Archbishop of Toulouse (1628–1651) and to Theller. 
It was added to the list of New Testament manuscripts by Scholz (1794–1852).
The manuscript was examined by Wettstein and Scholz. It was examined and described by Paulin Martin. C. R. Gregory saw the manuscript in 1885.

Scrivener dated it to the 13th century. Gregory, Soden, and Aland dated it to the 12th century. Currently it is dated by the INTF to the 12th century.

It is cited in critical editions of the Greek New Testament.

The manuscript is currently housed at the Bibliothèque nationale de France (Gr. 194) at Paris.

See also 

 List of New Testament minuscules
 Biblical manuscript
 Textual criticism

References

Further reading

External links 
 Online images of Minuscule 304] (Digital Microfilm) at the CSNTM.
 Online images of Minuscule 304] (Digital Microfilm) at the National Library of France.
 Minuscule 304 at the Encyclopedia of Textual Criticism

Greek New Testament minuscules
12th-century biblical manuscripts
Bibliothèque nationale de France collections